Elisha Ward (June 20, 1804 Poultney, Rutland County, Vermont – January 25, 1860 Silver Creek, Chautauqua County, New York) was an American lawyer and politician from New York.

Life
He was the son of William Ward (1778–1850) and Anna (Spencer) Ward (d. 1819). On May 28, 1833, he married Eliza Pease, and they had five children. In 1836, he removed to Dunkirk, New York, and in 1839 to Silver Creek. In 1840, he was appointed as an associate judge of the Chautauqua County Court.

He was a member of the New York State Assembly (Chautauqua Co.) in 1846.

He was a member of the New York State Senate (32nd D.) in 1852 and 1853.

Sources
The New York Civil List compiled by Franklin Benjamin Hough (pages 137, 147, 231 and 314; Weed, Parsons and Co., 1858)
The William Ward Genealogy by Charles Martyn (1925; pg. 342)
Ward Family by Andrew Henshaw Ward (Boston, 1851; pg. 207f)

External links

1804 births
1860 deaths
New York (state) state senators
People from Silver Creek, New York
New York (state) Whigs
19th-century American politicians
Members of the New York State Assembly
People from Poultney (town), Vermont
New York (state) state court judges
People from Dunkirk, New York
19th-century American judges